Hockeyanlage is a field hockey venue located at Olympiapark in Munich, Germany. The venue hosted the field hockey competitions for the 1972 Summer Olympics.

References
1972 Summer Olympics official report. Volume 2. Part 2. pp. 192–3.

Venues of the 1972 Summer Olympics
Olympic field hockey venues
Sports venues in Bavaria
Buildings and structures in Munich